The Texas Network (abbreviated as TXN) was a San Antonio, Texas-based media company that was founded in  and disestablished in . It produced radio and television broadcasts, as well as Internet content, at its height. Its flagship program was The News of Texas, a statewide newscast syndicated to 27 television stations in the state. Its president and CEO was Bob Rodgers, who was a successful news director at San Antonio's KENS-TV.

The News of Texas

The News of Texas was the chief program produced by TXN. It was a statewide newscast. Carriage at first was hard to find, and even then mostly on second-tier stations. A 2000 redesign fixed presentation problems, but it came too late to help the cause of The News of Texas, especially in the face of Belo Corporation's strong Texas Cable News (TXCN).

Other television programs from TXN included the hard news "Week in Review" and the softer "People, Places, and Things".

Radio and Internet
TXN also eventually produced radio and Internet content. Both ventures launched at the start of 2000. TXN Radio had twelve affiliate stations at the start, but it found significant and established competition in the CBS Texas State Network, which made it a hard sell. TXN.com and NewsofTexas.com were the websites for TXN and The News of Texas. Both the radio and Internet divisions shut down months before TXN's closure.

Closure
TXN was a money-losing proposition. In mid-June 2000, it restructured, cutting a third of its 120 staffers. But faced with the increasing move of The News of Texas to PBS member stations, where making advertising money was impossible, TXN announced it would fold just one week later. It shut down at the end of July 2000, with 13 affiliates scrambling to fill the program space, 80 people out of work, and a $45 million loss in the news business.

References

Mass media in San Antonio
Mass media companies established in 1998
Mass media companies disestablished in 2000
1998 establishments in Texas
2000 disestablishments in Texas